Rock and Roll Over is the fifth studio album by American rock band Kiss, released in 1976. It was recorded at the Star Theatre in Nanuet, New York.

Album information
To get the proper drum sound, Peter Criss recorded his tracks in a bathroom, communicating via video-link with the rest of the band. This is the first Kiss album to not feature a writing credit from Ace Frehley.

Many of the songs that appear on the album were developed before or during Destroyer. Three of Gene Simmons' songs are clear re-workings of demos from the 1975 Magna Graphics Studios demo: "Calling Dr. Love" is a re-working of "Bad, Bad Lovin'"; "Ladies Room" is based on "Don't Want Your Romance"; and "Love' Em and Leave' Em" is based on "Rock and Rolls-Royce"; Criss's "Baby Driver" is a rewrite of a Peter Criss/Stan Penridge demo from Criss's pre-Kiss band Lips; and "Hard Luck Woman", a song Paul Stanley originally planned to pitch to Rod Stewart, was held over to provide Criss a ballad to sing following the success of "Beth".

Release
Rock and Roll Over was released by Casablanca Records on November 11, 1976. and peaked at No. 11 on the Billboard 200.

The cover artwork is by artist Michael Doret, who worked with Kiss again on 2009's Sonic Boom. Inside the sleeve, there were a sticker of the cover art and a glossy photo press release pamphlet. The live album Kings Among Scotland, by Anthrax, pays homage to the artwork.

"Hard Luck Woman" did not equal the success of "Beth", but became another top 20 single. "Calling Dr. Love" became a concert staple.

Reception 

In a contemporary review of the album, Robert Christgau wrote that Kiss "write tough, catchy songs, and if they had a sly, Jagger-style singer they'd be a menace," but are diminished by appearing as a "caricature" of themselves.

Modern reviews are mixed. Greg Prato of AllMusic was largely praising of Rock and Roll Over for the band's "return to the raw hard rock of their first four albums," proclaiming it "one of Kiss' most consistent records." Pitchfork reviewer made a comparison with Destroyer and found it "sonically punchier, if not just a bit lacking in complete vitality." In his Collector's Guide to Heavy Metal, Martin Popoff called Rock and Roll Over "the most childish Kiss album" and "a disappointment after the amusing ambitions, diversions and excursions of Destroyer," lamenting the "return to the wee dumb hard rock cartoons of the early albums."

Track listing
All credits adapted from the original release.

Personnel
Kiss
Paul Stanley – vocals, rhythm guitar, first guitar solo on "I Want You"
Gene Simmons – vocals, bass; rhythm guitar on "Ladies Room"
Peter Criss – drums, vocals
Ace Frehley – lead guitar, backing vocals

Production
Eddie Kramer – producer, engineer, mixing at the Record Plant, New York City
Corky Stasiak – engineer

Charts

Album

Singles

Certifications

References

External links
 

Kiss (band) albums
1976 albums
Albums produced by Eddie Kramer
Casablanca Records albums